Boka is a village located in the Sečanj municipality, in the Central Banat District of Serbia. It is situated in the Autonomous Province of Vojvodina. The village has a Serb ethnic majority (57.32%) with large Hungarian minority (27.79%) and its population numbering 1,734 people (2002 census).

Name
In Serbian, the village is known as Boka (Бока), in Hungarian as Bóka, in German as Boka, and in Romanian as Boka.

Location 
It is situated in the Autonomous Province of Vojvodina, just on the east-southeast from the Sečanj.

History 

Historically, there were two Boka's, that later merged: Srpska Boka (Serb Boka) i Hrvatska Boka (Croat Boka).
Srpska Boka (in Hungarian sources: Szerb-Bóka) was in the neighbourhood of Sečanj, while Hrvatska Boka (in Hungarian sources: Horvát-Bóka) was located eastwards from Srpska Boka.
Hrvatska Boka got its name after Croatian settlers (nobles that originated from Turopolje), that were settled there by the Diocese of Zagreb on its possessions.

Ethnic groups (2002)
Serbs = 994
Hungarians = 482
Croats = 83
Romanians = 47
Yugoslavs = 16

Historical population
1961: 3,260
1971: 2,673
1981: 2,246
1991: 1,992
2002: 1,734

See also
List of places in Serbia
List of cities, towns and villages in Vojvodina

References
Slobodan Ćurčić, Broj stanovnika Vojvodine, Novi Sad, 1996.

Populated places in Serbian Banat